A stellarator is a plasma device that relies primarily on external magnets to confine a plasma. Scientists researching magnetic confinement fusion aim to use stellarator devices as a vessel for nuclear fusion reactions. The name refers to the possibility of harnessing the power source of the stars, such as the Sun. It is one of the earliest fusion power devices, along with the z-pinch and magnetic mirror.

The stellarator was invented by American scientist Lyman Spitzer of Princeton University in 1951, and much of its early development was carried out by his team at what became the Princeton Plasma Physics Laboratory (PPPL). Lyman's Model A began operation in 1953 and demonstrated plasma confinement. Larger models followed, but these demonstrated poor performance, losing plasma at rates far worse than theoretical predictions. By the early 1960s, any hope of quickly producing a commercial machine faded, and attention turned to studying the fundamental theory of high-energy plasmas. By the mid-1960s, Spitzer was convinced that the stellarator was matching the Bohm diffusion rate, which suggested it would never be a practical fusion device.

The release of information on the USSR's tokamak design in 1968 indicated a leap in performance. After great debate within the US industry, PPPL converted the Model C stellarator to the Symmetrical Tokamak (ST) as a way to confirm or deny these results. ST confirmed them, and large-scale work on the stellarator concept ended in the US as the tokamak got most of the attention for the next two decades. Research on the design continued in Germany and Japan, where several new designs were built.

The tokamak ultimately proved to have similar problems to the stellarators, but for different reasons. Since the 1990s, the stellarator design has seen renewed interest. New methods of construction have increased the quality and power of the magnetic fields, improving performance. A number of new devices have been built to test these concepts. Major examples include Wendelstein 7-X in Germany, the Helically Symmetric Experiment (HSX) in the US, and the Large Helical Device in Japan.

History

Previous work
In 1934, Mark Oliphant, Paul Harteck and Ernest Rutherford were the first to achieve fusion on Earth, using a particle accelerator to shoot deuterium nuclei into a metal foil containing deuterium, lithium or other elements. These experiments allowed them to measure the nuclear cross section of various reactions of fusion between nuclei, and determined that the tritium-deuterium reaction occurred at a lower energy than any other fuel, peaking at about 100,000 electronvolts (100 keV).

100 keV corresponds to a temperature of about a billion kelvins. Due to the Maxwell–Boltzmann statistics, a bulk gas at a much lower temperature will still contain some particles at these much higher energies. Because the fusion reactions release so much energy, even a small number of these reactions can release enough energy to keep the gas at the required temperature. In 1944, Enrico Fermi demonstrated that this would occur at a bulk temperature of about 50 million Celsius, still very hot but within the range of existing experimental systems. The key problem was confining such a plasma; no material container could withstand those temperatures. But because plasmas are electrically conductive, they are subject to electric and magnetic fields which provide a number of solutions.

In a magnetic field, the electrons and nuclei of the plasma circle the magnetic lines of force. One way to provide some confinement would be to place a tube of fuel inside the open core of a solenoid. A solenoid creates magnetic lines running down its center, and fuel would be held away from the walls by orbiting these lines of force. But such an arrangement does not confine the plasma along the length of the tube. The obvious solution is to bend the tube around into a torus (donut) shape, so that any one line forms a circle, and the particles can circle forever.

However, this solution does not actually work. For purely geometric reasons, the magnets ringing the torus are closer together on the inside curve, inside the "donut hole". Fermi noted this would cause the electrons to drift away from the nuclei, eventually causing them to separate and cause large voltages to develop. The resulting electric field would cause the plasma ring inside the torus to expand until it hit the walls of the reactor.

Stellarator
After World War II, a number of researchers began considering different ways to confine a plasma. George Paget Thomson of Imperial College London proposed a system now known as z-pinch, which runs a current through the plasma. Due to the Lorentz force, this current creates a magnetic field that pulls the plasma in on itself, keeping it away from the walls of the reactor. This eliminates the need for magnets on the outside, avoiding the problem Fermi noted. Various teams in the UK had built a number of small experimental devices using this technique by the late 1940s.

Another person working on controlled fusion reactors was Ronald Richter, a German scientist who moved to Argentina after the war. His thermotron used a system of electrical arcs and mechanical compression (sound waves) for heating and confinement. He convinced Juan Perón to fund development of an experimental reactor on an isolated island near the Chilean border. Known as the Huemul Project, this was completed in 1951. Richter soon convinced himself fusion had been achieved in spite of other people working on the project disagreeing. The "success" was announced by Perón on 24 March 1951, becoming the topic of newspaper stories around the world.

While preparing for a ski trip to Aspen, Lyman Spitzer received a telephone call from his father, who mentioned an article on Huemul in The New York Times. Looking over the description in the article, Spitzer concluded it could not possibly work; the system simply could not provide enough energy to heat the fuel to fusion temperatures. But the idea stuck with him, and he began considering systems that would work. While riding the ski lift, he hit upon the stellarator concept.

The basic concept was a way to modify the torus layout so that it addressed Fermi's concerns though the device's geometry. By twisting one end of the torus compared to the other, forming a figure-8 layout instead of a circle, the magnetic lines no longer travelled around the tube at a constant radius, instead they moved closer and further from the torus' center. A particle orbiting these lines would find itself constantly moving in and out across the minor axis of the torus. The drift upward while it travelled through one section of the reactor would be reversed after half an orbit and it would drift downward again. The cancellation was not perfect, but it appeared this would so greatly reduce the net drift rates that the fuel would remain trapped long enough to heat it to the required temperatures.

His 1958 description was simple and direct:

Matterhorn
While working at Los Alamos in 1950, John Wheeler suggested setting up a secret research lab at Princeton University that would carry on theoretical work on H-bombs after he returned to the university in 1951. Spitzer was invited to join this program, given his previous research in interstellar plasmas.

But by the time of his trip to Aspen, Spitzer had lost interest in bomb design, and upon his return, he turned his attention full-time to fusion as a power source. Over the next few months, Spitzer produced a series of reports outlining the conceptual basis for the stellarator, as well as potential problems. The series is notable for its depth; it not only included a detailed analysis of the mathematics of the plasma and stability but also outlined a number of additional problems like heating the plasma and dealing with impurities.

With this work in hand, Spitzer began to lobby the United States Atomic Energy Commission (AEC) for funding to develop the system. He outlined a plan involving three stages. The first would see the construction of a Model A, whose purpose was to demonstrate that a plasma could be created and that its confinement time was better than a torus. If the A model was successful, the B model would attempt to heat the plasma to fusion temperatures. This would be followed by a C model, which would attempt to actually create fusion reactions at a large scale. This entire series was expected to take about a decade.

Around the same time, Jim Tuck had been introduced to the pinch concept while working at Clarendon Laboratory at Oxford University. He was offered a job in the US and eventually ended up at Los Alamos, where he acquainted the other researchers with the concept. When he heard Spitzer was promoting the stellarator, he also travelled to Washington to propose building a pinch device. He considered Spitzer's plans "incredibly ambitious." Nevertheless, Spitzer was successful in gaining $50,000 in funding from the AEC, while Tuck received nothing.

The Princeton program was officially created on 1 July 1951. Spitzer, an avid mountain climber, proposed the name "Project Matterhorn" because he felt "the work at hand seemed difficult, like the ascent of a mountain." Two sections were initially set up, S Section working on the stellarator under Spitzer, and B Section working on bomb design under Wheeler. Matterhorn was set up at Princeton's new Forrestal Campus, a  plot of land the University purchased from the Rockefeller Institute for Medical Research when Rockefeller relocated to Manhattan. Spitzer set up the top-secret S Section in a former rabbit hutch.

It was not long before the other labs began agitating for their own funding. Tuck had managed to arrange some funding for his Perhapsatron through some discretionary budgets at LANL, but other teams at LANL, Berkeley and Oak Ridge (ORNL) also presented their ideas. The AEC eventually organized a new department for all of these projects, becoming "Project Sherwood".

Early devices
With the funding from the AEC, Spitzer began work by inviting James Van Allen to join the group and set up an experimental program. Allen suggested starting with a small "tabletop" device. This led to the Model A design, which began construction in 1952. The machine began operations in early 1953 and clearly demonstrated improved confinement over the simple torus.

This led to the construction of the Model B, which had the problem that the magnets were not well mounted and tended to move around when they were powered to their maximum capacity of 50,000 gauss. A second design also failed for the same reason, but this machine demonstrated several-hundred-kilovolt X-rays that suggested good confinement. The lessons from these two designs led to the B-1, which used ohmic heating (see below) to reach plasma temperatures around 100,000 degrees. This machine demonstrated that impurities in the plasma caused large x-ray emissions that rapidly cooled the plasma. In 1956, B-1 was rebuilt with an ultra-high vacuum system to reduce the impurities but found that even at smaller quantities they were still a serious problem. Another effect noticed in the B-1 was that during the heating process, the particles would remain confined for only a few tenths of a millisecond, while once the field was turned off, any remaining particles were confined for as long as 10 milliseconds. This appeared to be due to "cooperative effects" within the plasma.

Meanwhile, a second machine known as B-2 was being built. This was similar to the B-1 machine but used pulsed power to allow it to reach higher magnetic energy and included a second heating system known as magnetic pumping. This machine was also modified to add an ultra-high vacuum system. Unfortunately, B-2 demonstrated little heating from the magnetic pumping, which was not entirely unexpected because this mechanism required longer confinement times, and this was not being achieved. As it appeared that little could be learned from this system in its current form, in 1958 it was sent to the Atoms for Peace show in Geneva.

Two additional machines were built to study pulsed operation. B-64 was completed in 1955, essentially a larger version of the B-1 machine but powered by pulses of current that produced up to 15,000 gauss. This machine included a divertor, which removed impurities from the plasma, greatly reducing the x-ray cooling effect seen on earlier machines. B-64 included straight sections in the curved ends which gave it a squared-off appearance. This appearance led to its name, it was a "figure-8, squared", or 8 squared, or 64. This led to experiments in 1956 where the machine was re-assembled without the twist in the tubes, allowing the particles to travel without rotation.

B-65, completed in 1957, was built using the new "racetrack" layout. This was the result of the observation that adding helical coils to the curved portions of the device produced a field that introduced the rotation purely through the resulting magnetic fields. This had the added advantage that the magnetic field included shear, which was known to improve stability. B-3, also completed in 1957, was a greatly enlarged B-2 machine with ultra-high vacuum and pulsed confinement up to 50,000 gauss and projected confinement times as long as 0.01 second. The last of the B-series machines was the B-66, completed in 1958, which was essentially a combination of the racetrack layout from B-65 with the larger size and energy of the B-3.

Unfortunately, all of these larger machines demonstrated a problem that came to be known as "pump out". This effect was causing plasma drift rates that were not only higher than classical theory suggested but also much higher than the Bohm rates. B-3's drift rate was a full three times that of the worst-case Bohm predictions, and failed to maintain confinement for more than a few tens of microseconds.

Model C
 
As early as 1954, as research continued on the B-series machines, the design of the Model C device was becoming more defined. It emerged as a large racetrack-layout machine with multiple heating sources and a divertor, essentially an even larger B-66. Construction began in 1958 and was completed in 1961. The toroidal field coils normally operated at 35,000 gauss.

By the time Model C began operations, information collected from previous machines was making it clear that it would not be able to produce large-scale fusion. Ion transport across the magnetic field lines was much higher than classical theory suggested. Greatly increased magnetic fields of the later machines did little to address this, and confinement times simply were not improving. Attention began to turn to a much greater emphasis on the theoretical understanding of the plasma. In 1961, Melvin B. Gottlieb took over the Matterhorn Project from Spitzer, and on 1 February the project was renamed as the Princeton Plasma Physics Laboratory (PPPL).

Continual modification and experimentation on the Model C slowly improved its operation, and the confinement times eventually increased to match that of Bohm predictions. New versions of the heating systems were used that slowly increased the temperatures. Notable among these was the 1964 addition of a small particle accelerator to accelerate fuel ions to high enough energy to cross the magnetic fields, depositing energy within the reactor when they collided with other ions already inside. This method of heating, now known as neutral beam injection, has since become almost universal on magnetic confinement fusion machines.

Model C spent most of its history involved in studies of ion transport. Through continual tuning of the magnetic system and the addition of the new heating methods, in 1969, Model C eventually reached electron temperatures of 400 eV.

Other approaches
Through this period, a number of new potential stellarator designs emerged, which featured a simplified magnetic layout. The Model C used separate confinement and helical coils, as this was an evolutionary process from the original design which had only the confinement coils. Other researchers, notably in Germany, noted that the same overall magnetic field configuration could be achieved with a much simpler arrangement. This led to the torastron or heliotron layout.

In these designs, the primary field is produced by a single helical magnet, similar to one of the helical windings of the "classical" stellarator. In contrast to those systems, only a single magnet is needed, and it is much larger than those in the stellarators. To produce the net field, a second set of coils running poloidally around the outside of the helical magnet produces a second vertical field that mixes with the helical one. The result is a much simpler layout, as the poloidal magnets are generally much smaller and there is ample room between them to reach the interior, whereas in the original layout the toroidal confinement magnets are relatively large and leave little room between them.

A further update emerged from the realization that the total field could be produced through a series of independent magnets shaped like the local field. This results in a series of complex magnets that are arranged like the toroidal coils of the original layout. The advantage of this design is that the magnets are entirely independent; if one is damaged it can be individually replaced without affecting the rest of the system. Additionally, one can re-arrange the overall field layout by replacing the elements. These "modular coils" are now a major part of ongoing research.

Tokamak stampede
In 1968, scientists in the Soviet Union released the results of their tokamak machines, notably their newest example, T-3. The results were so startling that there was widespread scepticism. To address this, the Soviets invited a team of experts from the United Kingdom to test the machines for themselves. Their tests, made using a laser-based system developed for the ZETA reactor in England, verified the Soviet claims of electron temperatures of 1,000 eV. What followed was a "veritable stampede" of tokamak construction worldwide.

At first the US labs ignored the tokamak; Spitzer himself dismissed it out of hand as experimental error. However, as new results came in, especially the UK reports, Princeton found itself in the position of trying to defend the stellarator as a useful experimental machine while other groups from around the US were clamoring for funds to build tokamaks. In July 1969 Gottlieb had a change of heart, offering to convert the Model C to a tokamak layout. In December it was shut down and reopened in May as the Symmetric Tokamak (ST).

The ST immediately matched the performance being seen in the Soviet machines, besting the Model C's results by over ten times. From that point, PPPL was the primary developer of the tokamak approach in the US, introducing a series of machines to test various designs and modifications. The Princeton Large Torus of 1975 quickly hit several performance numbers that were required for a commercial machine, and it was widely believed the critical threshold of breakeven would be reached in the early 1980s. What was needed was larger machines and more powerful systems to heat the plasma to fusion temperatures.

Tokamaks are a type of pinch machine, differing from earlier designs primarily in the amount of current in the plasma: above a certain threshold known as the safety factor, or q, the plasma is much more stable. Machines following this rule showed dramatically improved performance. However, by the mid-1980s the easy path to fusion disappeared; as the amount of current in the new machines began to increase, a new set of instabilities in the plasma appeared. These could be addressed, but only by greatly increasing the power of the magnetic fields, requiring superconducting magnets and huge confinement volumes. The cost of such a machine was such that the involved parties banded together to begin the ITER project.

Stellarator returns
As the problems with the tokamak approach grew, interest in the stellarator approach reemerged. This coincided with the development of advanced computer aided planning tools that allowed the construction of complex magnets that were previously known but considered too difficult to design and build.

New materials and construction methods have increased the quality and power of the magnetic fields, improving performance. New devices have been built to test these concepts. Major examples include Wendelstein 7-X in Germany, the Helically Symmetric Experiment (HSX) in the US, and the Large Helical Device in Japan. W7X and LHD use superconducting magnetic coils.

The lack of an internal current eliminates some of the instabilities of the tokamak, meaning the stellarator should be more stable at similar operating conditions. On the downside, since it lacks the confinement provided by the current found in a tokamak, the stellarator requires more powerful magnets to reach any given confinement. The stellarator is an inherently steady-state machine, which has several advantages from an engineering standpoint.

Underlying concepts

Requirements for fusion
Heating a gas increases the energy of the particles within it, so by heating a gas into hundreds of millions of degrees, the majority of the particles within it reach the energy required to fuse. According to the Maxwell–Boltzmann distribution, some of the particles will reach the required energies at much lower average temperatures. Because the energy released by the fusion reaction is much greater than what it takes to start it, even a small number of reactions can heat surrounding fuel until it fuses as well.

Materials heated beyond a few tens of thousand degrees ionize into their electrons and nuclei, producing a gas-like state of matter known as plasma. According to the ideal gas law, like any hot gas, plasma has an internal pressure and thus wants to expand. For a fusion reactor, the challenge is to keep the plasma contained. In a magnetic field, the electrons and nuclei orbit around the magnetic field lines, confining them to the area defined by the field.

Magnetic confinement
A simple confinement system can be made by placing a tube inside the open core of a solenoid. The tube can be evacuated and then filled with the requisite gas and heated until it becomes a plasma. The plasma naturally wants to expand outwards to the walls of the tube, as well as move along it, towards the ends. The solenoid creates magnetic field lines running down the center of the tube, and the plasma particles orbit these lines, preventing their motion towards the sides. Unfortunately, this arrangement would not confine the plasma along the length of the tube, and the plasma would be free to flow out the ends.

The obvious solution to this problem is to bend the tube around into a torus (a ring or donut) shape. Motion towards the sides remains constrained as before, and while the particles remain free to move along the lines, in this case, they will simply circulate around the long axis of the tube. But, as Fermi pointed out, when the solenoid is bent into a ring, the electrical windings would be closer together on the inside than the outside. This would lead to an uneven field across the tube, and the fuel will slowly drift out of the center. Since the electrons and ions would drift in opposite directions, this would lead to a charge separation and electrostatic forces that would eventually overwhelm the magnetic force. Some additional force needs to counteract this drift, providing long-term confinement.

Stellarator concept
Spitzer's key concept in the stellarator design is that the drift that Fermi noted could be canceled out through the physical arrangement of the vacuum tube. In a torus, particles on the inside edge of the tube, where the field was stronger, would drift up, while those on the outside would drift down (or vice versa). However, if the particle were made to alternate between the inside and outside of the tube, the drifts would alternate between up and down and would cancel out. The cancellation is not perfect, leaving some net drift, but basic calculations suggested drift would be lowered enough to confine plasma long enough to heat it sufficiently.

Spitzer's suggestion for doing this was simple. Instead of a normal torus, the device would essentially be cut in half to produce two half-tori. They would then be joined with two straight sections between the open ends. The key was that they were connected to alternate ends so that the right half of one of the tori was connected to the left of the other. The resulting design resembled a figure-8 when viewed from above. Because the straight tubes could not pass through each other, the design did not lie flat, the tori at either end had to be tilted. This meant the drift cancellation was further reduced, but again, calculations suggested the system would work.

To understand how the system works to counteract drift, consider the path of a single particle in the system starting in one of the straight sections. If that particle is perfectly centered in the tube, it will travel down the center into one of the half-tori, exit into the center of the next tube, and so on. This particle will complete a loop around the entire reactor without leaving the center. Now consider another particle traveling parallel to the first, but initially located near the inside wall of the tube. In this case, it will enter the outside edge of the half-torus and begin to drift down. It exits that section and enters the second straight section, still on the outside edge of that tube. However, because the tubes are crossed, when it reaches the second half-torus it enters it on the inside edge. As it travels through this section it drifts back up.

This effect would reduce one of the primary causes of drift in the machine, but there were others to consider as well. Although the ions and electrons in the plasma would both circle the magnetic lines, they would do so in opposite directions, and at very high rotational speeds. This leads to the possibility of collisions between particles circling different lines of force as they circulate through the reactor, which due to purely geometric reasons, causes the fuel to slowly drift outward. This process eventually causes the fuel to either collide with the structure or cause a large charge separation between the ions and electrons. Spitzer introduced the concept of a divertor, a magnet placed around the tube that pulled off the very outer layer of the plasma. This would remove the ions before they drifted too far and hit the walls. It would also remove any heavier elements in the plasma.

Using classical calculations the rate of diffusion through collisions was low enough that it would be much lower than the drift due to uneven fields in a normal toroid. But earlier studies of magnetically confined plasmas in 1949 demonstrated much higher losses and became known as Bohm diffusion. Spitzer spent considerable effort considering this issue and concluded that the anomalous rate being seen by Bohm was due to instability in the plasma, which he believed could be addressed.

Alternative designs
One of the major concerns for the original stellarator concept is that the magnetic fields in the system will only properly confine a particle of a given mass traveling at a given speed. Particles traveling faster or slower will not circulate in the desired fashion. Particles with very low speeds (corresponding to low temperatures) are not confined and can drift out to the tube walls. Those with too much energy may hit the outside walls of the curved sections. To address these concerns, Spitzer introduced the concept of a divertor that would connect to one of the straight sections. This was essentially a mass spectrometer that would remove particles that were moving too fast or too slow for proper confinement.

The physical limitation that the two straight sections cannot intersect means that the rotational transform within the loop is not a perfect 180 degrees, but typically closer to 135 degrees. This led to alternate designs in an effort to get the angle closer to 180. An early attempt was built into the Stellarator B-2, which placed both curved sections flat in relation to the ground, but at different heights. The formerly straight sections had additional curves inserted, two sections of about 45 degrees, so they now formed extended S-shapes. This allowed them to route around each other while being perfectly symmetrical in terms of angles.

A better solution to the need to rotate the particles was introduced in the Stellarator B-64 and B-65. These eliminated the cross-over and flattened the device into an oval, or as they referred to it, a racetrack. The rotation of the particles was introduced by placing a new set of magnetic coils on the half-torus on either end, the corkscrew windings. The field from these coils mixes with the original confinement fields to produce a mixed field that rotates the lines of force through 180 degrees. This made the mechanical design of the reactor much simpler, but in practice, it was found that the mixed field was very difficult to produce in a perfectly symmetrical fashion.

Modern stellarator designs generally use a more complex series of magnets to produce a single shaped field. This generally looks like a twisted ribbon. Differences between the designs generally come down to how the magnets are arranged to produce the field, and the exact arrangement of the resulting field. A wide variety of layouts have been designed and some of these have been tested.

Heating
Unlike the z-pinch or tokamak, the stellarator has no induced electrical current within the plasma – at a macroscopic level, the plasma is neutral and unmoving, in spite of the individual particles within it rapidly circulating. In pinch machines, the current itself is one of the primary methods of heating the plasma. In the stellarator, no such natural heating source is present.

Early stellarator designs used a system similar to those in the pinch devices to provide the initial heating to bring the gas to plasma temperatures. This consisted of a single set of windings from a transformer, with the plasma itself forming the secondary set. When energized with a pulse of current, the particles in the region are rapidly energized and begin to move. This brings additional gas into the region, quickly ionizing the entire mass of gas. This concept was referred to as ohmic heating because it relied on the resistance of the gas to create heat, in a fashion not unlike a conventional resistance heater. As the temperature of the gas increases, the conductivity of the plasma improves. This makes the ohmic heating process less and less effective, and this system is limited to temperatures of about 1 million kelvins.

To heat the plasma to higher temperatures, Spitzer proposed a second heat source, the magnetic pumping system. This consisted of radio-frequency source fed through a coil spread along the vacuum chamber. The frequency is chosen to be similar to the natural frequency of the particles around the magnetic lines of force, the cyclotron frequency. This causes the particles in the area to gain energy, which causes them to orbit in a wider radius. Since other particles are orbiting their own lines nearby, at a macroscopic level, this change in energy appears as an increase in pressure. According to the ideal gas law, this results in an increase in temperature. Like ohmic heating, this process also becomes less efficient as the temperature increases, but is still capable of creating very high temperatures. When the frequency is deliberately set close to that of the ion circulation, this is known as ion-cyclotron resonance heating, although this term was not widely used at the time.

Inherent problems
Work on the then-new tokamak concept in the early 1970s, notably by Tihiro Ohkawa at General Atomics, suggested that toroids with smaller aspect ratios and non-circular plasmas would have much-improved performance. The aspect ratio is the comparison of the radius of the device as a whole to the radius of the cross-section of the vacuum tube. An ideal reactor would have no hole in the center, minimizing the aspect ratio. The modern spherical tokamak takes this to its practical limit, reducing the center hole to a single metal post, elongating the cross-section of the tubing vertically, producing an overall shape that is nearly spherical and has a ratio less than 2. The MAST device in the UK, among the most powerful of these designs, has a ratio of 1.3.

Stellarators generally require complex magnets to generate the desired field. In early examples, this was often in the form of several different sets of magnets, and while modern designs combine these together, the designs that result often require a considerable working volume. As a result, stellarators require a fair amount of working room in the center of the torus, and as a result, they also have relatively large aspect ratios. For instance, W7-X has an aspect ratio of 10, which leads to a very large overall size. There are some new layouts that aim to reduce the aspect ratio, but these remain untested  and the reduction is still nowhere near the level seen in modern tokamaks.

In a production design, the magnets would need to be protected from the 14.1 MeV neutrons being produced by the fusion reactions. This is normally accomplished through the use of a breeding blanket, a layer of material containing large amounts of lithium. In order to capture most of the neutrons, the blanket has to be about 1 to 1.5 meters thick, which moves the magnets away from the plasma and therefore requires them to be more powerful than those on experimental machines where they line the outside of the vacuum chamber directly. This is normally addressed by scaling the machine up to extremely large sizes, such that the ~10 centimetre separation found in smaller machines is linearly scaled to about 1 meter. This has the effect of making the machine much larger, growing to impractical sizes. Designs with smaller aspect ratios, which scale more rapidly, would address this effect to some degree, but designs of such systems, like ARIES-CS, are enormous, about 8 meters in radius with a relatively high aspect ratio of about 4.6.

The stellarator's complex magnets combine together to produce the desired field shape. This demands extremely high positioning tolerances which drive up construction costs. It was this problem that led to the cancellation of the US's National Compact Stellarator Experiment, or NCSX, which was an experimental low-aspect design with a ratio of 4.4. As it was assembled this was found to be impossible to achieve, even the natural sagging of the components over time was more than the allowed limit. Construction was cancelled in 2008, throwing the future of the PPPL into doubt.

Finally, stellarator designs are expected to leak around 5% of the generated alpha particles, increasing stress on the plasma-facing components of a reactor.

Plasma heating
There are several ways to heat the plasma (which must be done before ignition can occur).
Current heating The plasma is electrically conductive, and heats up when a current is passed through it (due to electrical resistance). Only used for initial heating, as the resistance is inversely proportional to the plasma temperature.

High-frequency electromagnetic waves The plasma absorbs energy when electromagnetic waves are applied to it (in the same manner as food in a microwave).

Heating by neutral particles A neutral particle beam injector makes ions and accelerates them with an electric field. To avoid being affected by the Stellarator's magnetic field, the ions must be neutralised. Neutralised ions are then injected into the plasma. Their high kinetic energy is transferred to the plasma particles by collisions, heating them.

Configurations

Several different configurations of stellarator exist, including:
Spatial stellarator The original figure-8 design that used geometry to produce the rotational transform of the magnetic fields.
Classical stellarator A toroidal or racetrack-shaped design with separate helical coils on either end to produce the rotation.
Torsatron A stellarator with continuous helical coils. It can also have the continuous coils replaced by a number of discrete coils producing a similar field. The Compact Auburn Torsatron at Auburn University is an example.
Heliotron A stellarator in which a helical coil is used to confine the plasma, together with a pair of poloidal field coils to provide a vertical field. Toroidal field coils can also be used to control the magnetic surface characteristics. The Large Helical Device in Japan uses this configuration.
Modular stellarator A stellarator with a set of modular (separated) coils and a twisted toroidal coil. e.g. Helically Symmetric Experiment (HSX) (and Helias (below))

Heliac A helical axis stellarator, in which the magnetic axis (and plasma) follows a helical path to form a toroidal helix rather than a simple ring shape. The twisted plasma induces twist in the magnetic field lines to effect drift cancellation, and typically can provide more twist than the Torsatron or Heliotron, especially near the centre of the plasma (magnetic axis). The original Heliac consists only of circular coils, and the flexible heliac (H-1NF, TJ-II, TU-Heliac) adds a small helical coil to allow the twist to be varied by a factor of up to 2.
Helias A helical advanced stellarator, using an optimized modular coil set designed to simultaneously achieve high plasma, low Pfirsch–Schluter currents and good confinement of energetic particles; i.e., alpha particles for reactor scenarios. The Helias has been proposed to be the most promising stellarator concept for a power plant, with a modular engineering design and optimised plasma, MHD and magnetic field properties. The Wendelstein 7-X device is based on a five field-period Helias configuration.

Recent results

Optimization to reduce transport losses
The goal of magnetic confinement devices is to minimise energy transport across a magnetic field. Toroidal devices are relatively successful because the magnetic properties seen by the particles are averaged as they travel around the torus. The strength of the field seen by a particle, however, generally varies, so that some particles will be trapped by the mirror effect. These particles will not be able to average the magnetic properties so effectively, which will result in increased energy transport. In most stellarators, these changes in field strength are greater than in tokamaks, which is a major reason that transport in stellarators tends to be higher than in tokamaks.

University of Wisconsin electrical engineering Professor David Anderson and research assistant John Canik proved in 2007 that the Helically Symmetric eXperiment (HSX) can overcome this major barrier in plasma research. The HSX is the first stellarator to use a quasisymmetric magnetic field. The team designed and built the HSX with the prediction that quasisymmetry would reduce energy transport. As the team's latest research showed, that is exactly what it does. "This is the first demonstration that quasisymmetry works, and you can actually measure the reduction in transport that you get," says Canik.

The newer Wendelstein 7-X in Germany was designed to be close to omnigeneity (a property of the magnetic field such that the mean radial drift is zero), which is a necessary but not sufficient condition for quasisymmetry; that is, all quasisymmetric magnetic fields are omnigenous, but not all omnigenous magnetic fields are quasisymmetric.

See also

List of plasma (physics) articles

Notes

References

Citations

Bibliography

External links

 Stellarator News from ORNL
 Stellarators Around the World – inc UST-2

 
American inventions